CKNX is a Canadian radio station, which broadcasts at 920 AM in Wingham, Ontario. The station broadcasts a classic country music & news format. CKNX is also an affiliate of the Toronto Blue Jays radio network.

History

Launch 

The station was originally launched in 1926 as an informal broadcasting experiment by local businessman W. T. Cruickshank, who aired live and unscripted programming provided by customers of his repair shop. In its original incarnation, the station was simply known as Joke, but proved so popular that Cruickshank applied for an amateur broadcasting license and the station formally became 10BP by 1930. In 1935, the station was officially licensed as commercial radio station CKNX, on 1200 AM. CKNX was affiliated with CBC Radio's Dominion Network until 1962.

Frequency move 
The station briefly moved to the 1230 frequency in 1941, and to its current 920 frequency a few months later. In the late 1940s and 1950s, the station's Saturday Night Barn Dance was one of the most popular and influential radio programs in Ontario.

CKNX-TV 
In 1955, CKNX-TV was also launched. On March 8, 1962, the building which accommodated the CKNX radio and television stations caught fire.  Although nothing could be salvaged, CKNX was back on the air within a few hours, broadcasting from temporary facilities at the transmitter site and using the nearby high school gym as a TV studio. CKNX operations continued as such (with various temporary offices set up in Wingham) until they purchased new equipment and moved into a new building in 1963.

Acquisition 
The stations were acquired in 1971 by Blackburn Radio, who also launched CKNX-FM in 1977. Blackburn sold the television station to Baton Broadcasting in 1993, but retains ownership of the radio stations to this day. Blackburn also launched a second FM station in Wingham, CIBU, in 2005.

FM application
On May 31, 2011, Blackburn Radio applied to add a new FM transmitter at Wingham to rebroadcast the programming of CKNX 920 Wingham on the frequency 104.3 MHz. This application was denied by the CRTC on May 10, 2013.

References

External links
 CKNX AM920
 
 

Knx
Knx
Knx
Radio stations established in 1926
1926 establishments in Ontario
KNX